Ruisui is a railway station on the Taiwan Railways Administration Taitung line located in Ruisui Township, Hualien County, Taiwan.

History
The station was opened on 26 January 1915.

Around the station
 Rareseed Ranch
 Ruisui Tropic of Cancer Marker
 Saoba Stone Pillars

See also
 List of railway stations in Taiwan

References

1915 establishments in Taiwan
Railway stations in Hualien County
Railway stations opened in 1915
Railway stations served by Taiwan Railways Administration